State Highway 109 (SH 109) is a  long state highway in southeastern Colorado. SH 109's southern terminus is at U.S. Route 160 (US 160) north of Kim, and the northern terminus a continuation north as Grand Avenue in Cheraw.

Route description 
The road begins in the south at its junction with US 160 roughly two miles north of Kim. From there the road proceeds northward for  through remote, sparsely populated land, including a section of Comanche National Grassland, before reaching La Junta, the first of only two towns along the route's length. At La Junta, SH 109 intersects US 50 indirectly via SH 109 Spur (3rd Street). After crossing over US 50, the road continues northward, passing the La Junta Municipal Airport, to the small town of Cheraw where the road officially ends by becoming a city street called Grand Avenue.

History 
The route was established in the 1920s, when it began at Karvel and headed eastward to Genoa. Several new sections including spurs and extensions were added in 1939. The route was paved in several segments by 1946. In 1954, most of the route was deleted, leaving only a segment from La Junta to Cheraw. The terminus was corrected by 1983. The entire route was paved by 1965.

Major intersections

Related route

SH 109 has a spur route in La Junta that spans for about 0.2 miles. It runs down on Bradish Avenue from US 50 and then heads east on 3rd street, then terminating at SH 109 (Adams Avenue)

References

External links 

109
Transportation in Las Animas County, Colorado
Transportation in Bent County, Colorado
Transportation in Otero County, Colorado